Maruša Černjul (born 30 June 1992) is a Slovenian athlete specialising in the high jump. She represented her country at the 2016 Summer Olympics in Rio de Janeiro without qualifying for the final.

Her personal bests in the event are 1.93 metres outdoors (Celje 2016) and 1.90 metres indoors (Lincoln 2016).

International competitions

References

1992 births
Living people
Athletes (track and field) at the 2016 Summer Olympics
Nebraska Cornhuskers women's track and field athletes
Olympic athletes of Slovenia
Slovenian expatriate sportspeople in the United States
Slovenian female high jumpers
Sportspeople from Celje